Ádám Fekete (born 16 May 1994) is a Hungarian sprint canoeist.

He won a medal at the 2019 ICF Canoe Sprint World Championships.

References

External links

1994 births
Living people
Hungarian male canoeists
ICF Canoe Sprint World Championships medalists in Canadian
Canoeists from Budapest
21st-century Hungarian people